Joseph Edward Therrien (March 17, 1879 – October 7, 1954) was an American businessman and politician.

Born in Canada, he moved with his parents to Two Harbors, Minnesota in 1882 where he studied law. In 1908, he moved to Pine City, Minnesota. He owned Pine City Abstract Company in Pine City, Minnesota. He served in Lake County, Minnesota government and was county auditor for Pine County, Minnesota. Therrien also served as probate judge for Pine County, Minnesota 1917-1920. He served in the Minnesota House of Representatives 1923-1931 and 1943-1947.

Notes

1879 births
1954 deaths
People from Two Harbors, Minnesota
People from Pine City, Minnesota
Businesspeople from Minnesota
County officials in Minnesota
Minnesota state court judges
Members of the Minnesota House of Representatives
Canadian emigrants to the United States